Carol Thomas-Jacobs is a lawyer who is a nominee to serve on the United States Virgin Islands Superior Court. She formerly served as the acting Attorney General of the United States Virgin Islands in 2023.

Life 
Thomas-Jacobs worked for the U.S. Virgin Islands Department of Justice for 20 years, first serving as an Assistant Attorney General in the Civil Division, then as head of the Civil Division. In 2016, she became deputy attorney general. She was promoted to chief deputy attorney general in 2020. She was appointed by governor Albert Bryan to replace Denise George as the acting Attorney General of the United States Virgin Islands on January 1, 2023. In March 2023, Bryan nominated Thomas-Jacobs to the United States Virgin Islands Superior Court.

See also 

 List of female state attorneys general in the United States
 List of minority attorneys general in the United States

References 

21st-century African-American people
21st-century African-American women
21st-century American lawyers
21st-century American women lawyers
African-American lawyers
African-American women lawyers
Living people
Place of birth missing (living people)
United States Virgin Islands lawyers
Year of birth missing (living people)